Microbabesia is a genus of parasitic alveolates belonging to the phylum Apicomplexa.

History

This genus was described by the Dutch scientist Sohns in 1918 while in the Dutch East Indies.

This species and genus has not been redescribed since.

Description

Host range

Note

The genus Microbabesia may be synonymous with that of Babesia. Further work in this area will be need to clarify this.

References

Apicomplexa genera